Dembi Dolo University is a national university located in Dembidolo town, in Oromia Region, about 645 kilometers away from Addis Ababa, Ethiopia. Established in 2015, under Proclamation No.650/2001 article 5(1), the campus is situated in 135 hectares. 

On 20 May 2018, the university main building was inaugurated by Prime Minister Abiy Ahmed.

History 
Dembi Dolo University was officially accredited by the Ministry of Education in 2015 and began the learning process in 2018. It was founded under Proclamation No 650/2001 article 5(1). The university is located in Dembidolo town, 645 kilometers west of Addis Ababa. It is situated in an area of 135 hectares. On 20 May 2018, Dembidolo University building was inaugurated by Prime Minister Abiy Ahmed, encompassing 35 departments and enrolled 1,500 students in this academic year.  

Currently, the university is evolving in quality of research and teaching around 3,750 undergraduate and postgraduate students. Additionally, the university employs 772 both academic and administrative staff.

2019 student abduction
In November 2019, 17 students of the university, mostly ethnic Amhara were kidnapped. According to the president Dr. Leta Tesfaye, 12 of the 17 kidnapped students are from the university campus. In July 2020, the Federal High Court of Ethiopia accused 17 individuals who were suspected of abducting the students for ethnically motivated violence, especially linked to the Oromo Liberation Front (OLF).

References

Universities and colleges in Ethiopia
2015 establishments in Ethiopia
Oromia Region